Charles Chubb (31 December 1851 – 25 June 1924) was a British ornithologist.

Family 
Chubb was born in Steeple Langford near Salisbury, England. He married twice, to Ada Albion and Alice Mabel Baker. He had seven children, among them Ernest Charles Chubb who also became an ornithologist and was a museum curator in Durban.

In 1924, Chubb was knocked down by a car outside the Natural History Museum, London, and died two weeks later in that city.

Career 
Chubb began working at the British Museum at the age of 26.

Among the birds he described are Cobb's wren and the tinamou genus Crypturellus.

Works 
 The Birds of British Guiana, based on the collection of Frederick Vavasour McConnell (2 volumes, 1916 and 1921)
 The Birds of South America (1912, with Lord Brabourne)

References

External links
 

1851 births
1924 deaths
People from Wiltshire
Road incident deaths in London
Employees of the British Museum
British ornithologists